Joyce Liebert, married name Joyce Lawrence, (16 May 1914 – 8 June 1999) was an English cricketer who played as an all-rounder. She appeared in 4 Test matches for England in 1934 and 1935. These were the first four women's tests, and she was the youngest member of England's touring party. She played domestic cricket for various composite and regional teams, such as North Women, as well as appearing for Lancashire.

References

External links
 
 

1914 births
1999 deaths
Sportspeople from Lancashire
England women Test cricketers
Lancashire women cricketers